"The Killing of Georgie (Part I and II)" is a song written and recorded by Rod Stewart and  released as a track on his 1976 album A Night on the Town. The song tells the story of a gay man who was killed in New York City. A two-part song, Part I was the more popular hit and was blended into the more melancholy and sombre Part II.

Lyrics
The song tells the life story of Georgie, a gay friend of the narrator. When young Georgie reveals his sexuality to his parents, his father asks, "How can my son not be straight, after all I've said and done for him?" Georgie, cast out by his parents, heads for New York City where he becomes successful and popular in Manhattan's upper class, "the toast of the Great White Way". The narrator visits him in Summer 1975, when Georgie tells him he's in love; the narrator is pleased for him. Georgie attends the opening night of a Broadway musical, but has no interest in lingering afterward so he leaves "before the final curtain call" and heads crosstown. He is attacked near East 53rd Street by a New Jersey gang of thieves that was waiting in a car on a "darkened side street" and one thief inadvertently kills him. The narrator remembers Georgie's advice on living life to the full while young, before it ends. The second part of song has the narrator pleading that Georgie stay.

Stewart admitted taking poetic license with actual details of the murder, in service of the song.

Background
In the May 1995 issue of Mojo, Stewart explained: "That was a true story about a gay friend of [Stewart's earlier group ] The Faces. He was especially close to me and Mac [Faces' pianist]. But he was knifed or shot, I can't remember which. That was a song I wrote totally on me own over the chord of open E." The switchblade knife in the song's lyrics implies that Georgie was stabbed to death.

When he was asked about writing a song with a gay theme, Stewart said, "It's probably because I was surrounded by gay people at that stage. I had a gay PR man, a gay manager. Everyone around me was gay. I don't know whether that prompted me into it or not. I think it was a brave step, but it wasn't a risk. You can't write a song like that unless you've experienced it. But it was a subject that no one had approached before. And I think it still stands up today."

Part II provides a coda to the song and employs a melody identical to The Beatles' "Don't Let Me Down". In a 1980 interview, John Lennon said, "the lawyers never noticed". Stewart noted: "It does sound like it", adding "I’m sure if you look back to the 60s, you’d find other songs with those three chords and that melody line."

Reception
Billboard said that the lyrics were "a topic of social import" and that Stewart's "gravelly" vocal performance contrasted well with the melody. Record World said that "Stewart 's saga of the death of a gay friend has received much FM play and been hailed as a breakthrough for the artist."

Karl Pilkington has often cited this song as one of his favourite tracks.

Charts

Weekly charts

Year-end charts

References

External links

1976 songs
1976 singles
Rod Stewart songs
LGBT-related songs
Songs inspired by deaths
Songs written by Rod Stewart
Music videos directed by Bruce Gowers
Song recordings produced by Tom Dowd
Warner Records singles
Riva Records singles